Blanche Ely High School is a high school located in Pompano Beach, Broward County, Florida. The school is named for Blanche Ely, former principal and social activist.

In addition to Pompano Beach, Ely serves a portion of Deerfield Beach and a portion of Lauderdale-by-the-Sea.

Magnet program
Blanche Ely High School offers medical and engineering magnet programs and vocational programs such as the Health Occupations Students of America (HOSA) and the LPN nursing

The Practical Nursing Program at Blanche Ely High School is part of the Broward County Practical Nursing Program.  It is the only Practical Nursing Program in a comprehensive high school in the State of Florida.  Students who qualify for this program, and successfully complete it, are awarded certificates of completion at the end of their senior year.  They also qualify to take the Florida State Board of Nursing licensing exam (NCLEX) to become Licensed Practical Nurses.

In addition to completing the general education requirements for graduation, students are required to take specific prerequisites prior to acceptance into the program. Courses in the discipline of nursing are taken during the junior and senior years and include classroom, laboratory and nursing practicum in a variety of health care settings. Such as clinics, nursing homes & hospitals.  Emphasis is placed on preparing students capable of safe, competent practice with provisions for progressive educational growth and upward mobility in nursing.  Admission into the program is both limited access and competitive.

Extracurricular activities

Sports 
Their mascot is the Mighty Tiger. State championship include 2002 in football, 1993, 2007, 2012, and 2013 in boys basketball, and 2003 and 2007 in track and field. Under the guidance of Coach William F. Boynton Blanche Ely High School won the Class A Florida High School Athletic Association Cross Country Championship in 1968. The Cross Country Team finished runners-up in 1969.

In 1967, Ely met McArthur in the season opener for both teams. This, along with another game in Broward County between Fort Lauderdale and Dillard the same night, was the first meeting between white and black teams.

JROTC
Blanche Ely High School has an Army Junior Reserve Officers' Training Corps (JROTC) unit.

Television production
BETV was a daily newscast that featured anchors, reporters, and special segments that are broadcast throughout the school. The newscast won awards twice. BETV aired its final episode (Episode #1330) on 7 June 2010.

Organizations
Blanche Ely High School provides a wide range of organizations students can get involved in. Whether it is to help win scholarships or have a little fun after school. These organizations include: SIGMA, The Ladies of Intrigue, Adimu: Men of Excellence, Kiada: Ladies of Distinction, Gentlemen of Influence, French Club, Bandaids, Icon, ESA, Student Government, etc.

Demographics
As of the 2021-22 school year, the total student enrollment was 1,993. The ethnic makeup of the school was 74.6% Black, 23.1% White,  21.5% Hispanic, 0.6% Asian, 0.1% Pacific Islander, 1.4% Multiracial, and 0.3% Native American or Native Alaskan.

Notable alumni

Entertainment

Rosewood

Sports

See also
Ely Educational Museum

References

External links
Blanche Ely High School

Broward County Public Schools
High schools in Broward County, Florida
Public high schools in Florida
Magnet schools in Florida
Buildings and structures in Pompano Beach, Florida
Historically segregated African-American schools in Florida
Pompano Beach, Florida